Olla may refer to:

Cooking
 Olla, a ceramic cooking pot, used in Spain and Spanish-speaking Latin America countries
 Olla (Roman pot), the very similar ancient Roman version
 Tamal de olla, a large Panamanian tamal that fills the baking pan in which it is cooked

Places
 Olla, Louisiana, a town in La Salle Parish, United States
 Olla, Nigeria, a settlement in Western Nigeria

Other uses 
 Olla (beetle), a genus of ladybird beetles in the family Coccinellidae
 Olla (fungus),  a genus of fungi in the family Hyaloscyphaceae
 Olla (2019 film), is a short movie directed by Ariane Labed
 Olla, LLC, the parent company of Pickle-Ball, Inc.

See also 

 Hebban olla vogala, the first three words of a fragment of Dutch discovered in 1932 in the margin of a Latin manuscript
 Oya (disambiguation)
 Johnny Ola, a fictional character in The Godfather, Part II

Genus disambiguation pages